Twenty-Four Hours (Chinese: 二十四小时; pinyin: Èrshísì xiǎoshí) is a Chinese variety show on Zhejiang Television. It is a large-scale outdoor game-variety show where cast members attempt to complete missions to find a mysterious item, and features an overarching plot during each season.

Program Details

Season 1 
The six cast members (Chen Kun, Wu Lei, Han Geng, Xu Zheng, Dapeng, and Yin Zheng) take on the roles of sailors from the Ming Dynasty who have been brought through a time gate to 2016. In order to return home, they must find the special stars around the world by finding the "master of the star".

Within 24 hours, the teams must discover the "master of the star" and the star that they are hiding by completing tasks. However, at least one member of the teams is assigned the role of "master of the star", and must complete a separate task without being discovered by the other members. After 24 hours, the members must correctly identify the "master of the star" in order to earn a star, otherwise the "master of the star" gains two stars. They are divided into two teams, with Chen Kun leading a team of Wu Lei and Han Geng, and Xu Zhen leading a team of Dapeng and Yin Zheng.

Season 2

Season 3

Cast Members

Current Cast

Former Cast

Episodes

Season 1

References

Chinese variety television shows